This is a non-definitive list of most expensive Finnish films.

References 

 http://www.hs.fi/grafiikka/1135249487083
 http://www.hs.fi/kulttuuri/artikkeli/Nykyanimaatiot+kirkkaasti+Suomen+elokuvahistorian+kalleimpia/1135249488275
 http://fin.afterdawn.com/uutiset/arkisto/19514.cfm

See also 
 List of most expensive non-English language films

Most expensive Finnish films
 

Finnish